Chuseu or Juseu is a locality located in the municipality of Graus, in Huesca province, Aragon, Spain. As of 2020, it has a population of 19.

Geography 
Chuseu is located 89km east of Huesca.

References

Populated places in the Province of Huesca